Fernando Emilio Novas (born 1960) is an Argentine paleontologist working for the Comparative Anatomy Department of the Bernardino Rivadavia Natural Sciences Museum in Buenos Aires, Argentina. Novas holds a PhD in Natural sciences.

Working for the CONICET, he described or co-described many dinosaurs, among them Abelisaurus, Aniksosaurus, Aragosaurus, Austroraptor, Chilesaurus, Megaraptor, Neuquenraptor, Orkoraptor, Patagonykus, Unenlagia, Araucanoraptor, Skorpiovenator, Tyrannotitan, Talenkauen, and Puertasaurus, most from the Patagonia region of Argentina. Chilesaurus diegosuarezi  made the cover of Nature magazine on June 18, 2015.

References

Argentine paleontologists
Living people
 
1960 births